Merriam  is a city in Johnson County, Kansas, United States, and part of the Kansas City Metropolitan Area.  As of the 2020 census, the population of the city was 11,098.  Merriam is included in the Shawnee Mission postal designation. It is also the headquarters of Seaboard Corporation.

History
Merriam was incorporated as a third class city on October 28, 1950, and established second class city status on January 18, 1957.

The city was named in honor of Charles Merriam, a one-time secretary/treasurer of the then Kansas City, Fort Scott and Gulf railroad (later the St. Louis–San Francisco Railway) which ran through the area.

Geography
Merriam is located at  (39.020888, -94.693784).  It is bordered by the cities of Overland Park to the east and south, Shawnee to the west, and Kansas City, Kansas to the north (in Wyandotte County); the city of Lenexa is less than a mile to the southwest.  The city straddles approximately three miles of Interstate 35 from less than a mile southwest of its junction with Interstate 635 south to 75th Street.  Shawnee Mission Parkway, an east–west road, nearly bisects the city.  U.S. Routes 59 and 69 follow the Interstate to the south of the city and follow Shawnee Mission Parkway to the east from its junction with the Interstate.  Turkey Creek, following a roughly parallel path to the Interstate, flows through the city.

Demographics

2010 census
As of the census of 2010, there were 11,003 people, 4,900 households, and 2,788 families living in the city. The racial makeup of the city was 83.4% White, 6.1% African American, 0.5% Native American, 2.6% Asian, 0.1% Pacific Islander, 3.9% from other races, and 3.6% from two or more races. Hispanic or Latino of any race were 10.7% of the population.

There were 4,900 households, of which 25.3% had children under the age of 18 living with them, 41.6% were married couples living together, 11.3% had a female householder with no husband present, 4.0% had a male householder with no wife present, and 43.1% were non-families. 34.9% of all households were made up of individuals, and 9.4% had someone living alone who was 65 years of age or older. The average household size was 2.21 and the average family size was 2.88.

The median age in the city was 37.4 years. 20.1% of residents were under the age of 18; 8.4% were between the ages of 18 and 24; 30.9% were from 25 to 44; 26.6% were from 45 to 64; and 13.9% were 65 years of age or older. The gender makeup of the city was 47.8% male and 52.2% female.

2000 census
As of the U.S. Census in 2000, there were 11,008 people, 4,839 households, and 2,903 families living in the city. The racial makeup of the city was 89.24% White, 4.02% Black or African American, 0.42% Native American, 2.09% Asian, 0.02% Pacific Islander, 1.95% from other races, and 2.25% from two or more races. Hispanic or Latino of any race were 5.41% of the population. The ancestral makeup was 21.9% German, 12.9% English, 11.5% Irish and 7.7% American.

There were 4,839 households, out of which 26.3% had children under the age of 18 living with them, 46.8% were married couples living together, 9.7% had a female householder with no husband present, and 40.0% were non-families. 33.3% of all households were made up of individuals, and 7.6% had someone living alone who was 65 years of age or older. The average household size was 2.23 and the average family size was 2.86.

In the city, the population was spread out, with 21.7% under the age of 18, 8.3% from 18 to 24, 34.0% from 25 to 44, 23.8% from 45 to 64, and 12.2% who were 65 years of age or older. The median age was 36 years. For every 100 females, there were 92.6 males. For every 100 females age 18 and over, there were 90.9 males.

As of 2000 the median income for a household was $48,455, and the median income for a family was $54,639. Males had a median income of $37,358 versus $29,815 for females. The per capita income for the city was $23,988. About 4.3% of families and 6.2% of the population were below the poverty line, including 9.7% of those under age 18 and 7.1% of those age 65 or over.

Economy
Seaboard Corporation is based in Merriam.  Until 2019 the home of Lee Jeans.

IKEA announced the construction and opening of an IKEA store at Johnson Drive & Interstate 35. It added between 200 and 500 jobs in Spring 2015.

Top employers
According to Merriam's 2018 Comprehensive Annual Financial Report, the top employers in the city were:

Libraries
Johnson County Library serves residents of Merriam. The library's Antioch branch is located at the intersection of Shawnee Mission Parkway and Antioch road. At one time, this branch served as the headquarters for the library system.

References

Further reading

External links
 City of Merriam
 Merriam - Directory of Public Officials
 Merriam city map, KDOT

Cities in Kansas
Cities in Johnson County, Kansas
Cities in Kansas City metropolitan area
1950 establishments in Kansas
Populated places established in 1950